The 1987–88 Football League season was Birmingham City Football Club's 85th in the Football League and their 35th in the Second Division. They finished in 19th position in the division, expanded for this season to 23 teams as part of a restructuring process, and again avoided relegation only by two points. They entered the 1987–88 FA Cup in the third round proper and lost in the fifth round to Nottingham Forest, and were beaten by Mansfield Town over two legs in the first round of the League Cup and by Derby County in the first round of the Full Members' Cup.

Football League Second Division

The league programme did not end on the same day for all clubs. Although Birmingham were in 18th place after their last match, on 6 May, the last Second Division fixture was played the following day, when they were overtaken by Shrewsbury Town, so finished 19th.

League table (part)

FA Cup

League Cup

Full Members' Cup

Appearances and goals

Numbers in parentheses denote appearances as substitute.
Players with name struck through and marked  left the club during the playing season.
Players with names in italics and marked * were on loan from another club for the whole of their season with Birmingham.

See also
Birmingham City F.C. seasons

References
General
 
 
 Source for match dates, league positions and results: 
 Source for line-ups, appearances, goalscorers and attendances: Matthews (2010), Complete Record, pp. 410–11, 480.

Specific

Birmingham City F.C. seasons
Birmingham City